() is a Filipino beef soup originating from Bacolod which is spread across the rest of the Western Visayas region. It is made with beef shank and  bone marrow boiled until gelatinous. It is uniquely slightly soured with fruits like batuan or bilimbi. Cansi is usually cooked with unripe breadfruit or jackfruit, lemongrass, tomatoes, garlic, onions, fish sauce, and siling haba or labuyo peppers. The soup is usually orange in color due to the use of annatto seeds (atsuete). It is also sometimes dubbed as "sinigang na bulalo" in Tagalog regions, due to its similarity to sinigang and bulalo.

See also
Nilaga
Bulalo
Philippine cuisine

References

Philippine stews
Beef dishes